Route 332, or Highway 332, may refer to:

Canada
 Manitoba Provincial Road 332
 Newfoundland and Labrador Route 332
 Nova Scotia Route 332
 Prince Edward Island Route 332
 Saskatchewan Highway 332

Costa Rica
 National Route 332

India
 National Highway 332 (India)

Japan
 Japan National Route 332

United States
 Florida State Road 332 (former)
  Georgia State Route 332
  Indiana State Road 332
  Kentucky Route 332
  Louisiana Highway 332
  Maryland Route 332
  Minnesota State Highway 332
  Mississippi Highway 332
  Montana Secondary Highway 332
  New York State Route 332
  Ohio State Route 332
  Oregon Route 332
  Pennsylvania Route 332
  South Carolina Highway 332
  Tennessee State Route 332
 Texas:
  Texas State Highway 332
  Texas State Highway Loop 332 (former)
  Farm to Market Road 332
  Virginia State Route 332
  Wyoming Highway 332

Other areas:
  Puerto Rico Highway 332
  U.S. Virgin Islands Highway 332